Desperadoes is a Weird West comic book series written by Jeff Mariotte, first published by Homage Comics and then by IDW Publishing.

Characters
 Gideon Brood
 Abby DeGrazia
 Race Kennedy
 Jerome Alexander Betts
 Clay Parkhurst

Publication
Each story arc is a limited series which has been collected in a number of volumes:
 Desperadoes: A Moment's Sunlight (with John Cassaday, Homage Comics/Wildstorm, 5-issue mini-series, 1997-1998, tpb, 104 pages, July 1998)
 Desperadoes: Epidemic! (with art laid out by John Cassaday and drawn by John Lucas, Homage Comics/Wildstorm, one-shot, 1999, ISBN B0006RRCHQ)
 Desperadoes: Quiet of the Grave (with John Severin, Homage Comics/DC Comics, 5-issue mini-series, tpb, 128 pages, December 2002)
 Desperadoes: Banners of Gold (with Jeremy Haun, 5-issue mini-series, IDW Publishing, tpb, 120 pages, August 2005, hardcover , softback )
 Desperadoes: Buffalo Dreams (with Alberto Dose, 4-issue mini-series, IDW Publishing, January 2007, tpb, September 2007)

External links 
 IDW page
 Unpublished script
 2002 interview about Quiet of the Grave
 October 2006 interview and preview of upcoming series "Buffalo Dreams"

1997 comics debuts
Comics by Jeff Mariotte
Fantasy Westerns
IDW Publishing titles
Western (genre) comics